Walter Bowman may refer to:
 Walter Bowman (soccer) (born 1870), Canadian soccer player
 Walter S. Bowman (1865–1938), photographer in Pendleton, Oregon
 Walter Bowman (antiquary) (died 1782), Scottish antiquary